Kuramoto (written:  or ) is a Japanese surname. Notable people with the surname include:

, Japanese baseball player and coach
, Japanese judoka
, Japanese golfer
, Japanese playwright and screenwriter
, Japanese footballer
, Japanese baseball player
, Japanese physicist
, Japanese pianist and composer

Japanese-language surnames